Duomi Khan (多彌可汗) (died  646), personal name Bazhuo (拔灼), full regal name Jialijulixueshaduomi Khan (頡利俱利薛沙多彌可汗), was a khan of the Xueyantuo.  After the death of his father, the Zhenzhu Khan Yi'nan, he disputed with and killed his older brother, Yemang (曵莽), and became khan in 645. Then, reversing his father's peaceful policy with the Tang Dynasty, Duomi Khan immediately started incursions into their territory. This drew a heavy response from Emperor Taizong of Tang, who sent the generals Qiao Shiwang (喬師望), Zhishi Sili (執失思力), and Li Daozong to defend. They proved too strong for Duomi Khan's attacks, so he fled. But he did not live long. He was betrayed by his own vassal,  Huige, who rebelled and killed him.

Under Yi'nan
It is not known when Bazhuo was born, but it was known that he was not his father Yi'nan's oldest son—although throughout historical records, Yi'nan's oldest son was various referred to as Jialibi (頡利苾), Dadu (大度), and Yemang (曳莽), who might or might not be the same person—but as he was born of Yi'nan's wife, he was in an honored position at Yi'nan's court starting from early times in Yi'nan's reign.  As of 638, with Yi'nan having more than 200,000 soldiers under him, Yi'nan was said to have divided his army between Bazhuo and Jialibi, having Bazhuo command the army to the south and Jialibi to the north; it was further said that Emperor Taizong of Tang, in order to foster dissent between the brothers, created them both subordinate khan titles under Yi'nan and awarded them drums and banners, ostensibly to honor them.  In a reference that was either referring to the same event or not, Bazhuo and Yemang were described to have been both created subordinate khan titles, at Yi'nan's request, with Yemang given the eastern part of the khanate to govern over various tribes, with the title of Tulishi Khan, and with Bazhuo given the western part of the khanate to govern over the Xueyantuo people, with the title of Siyehu Khan.

See also
 Emperor Taizong's campaign against Xueyantuo

Notes and references

 Tang Huiyao, vol. 96.

Xueyantuo khans
Tang dynasty people
646 deaths
Year of birth unknown
7th-century rulers in Asia